Palaio may refer to the following places in Greece:

Palaio Faliro, suburb in the southern part of Athens
Palaio Loutro, small mountain village in Messenia, Peloponnese
Palaio Olvio, settlement in the Xanthi regional unit
Palaio Pedino, village on the island of Lemnos
Palaio Klima, village on the island of Skopelos seriously damaged by the 1967 earthquake.